Dehnow-e Bala or Deh Now-e Bala or Deh Now Bala or Deh Now-ye Bala or Deh-e Now Bala may refer to various places in Iran:
 Deh Now-ye Bala, Chaharmahal and Bakhtiari
 Deh Now-ye Bala, Lamerd, Fars Province
 Deh Now-e Bala, Rostam, Fars Province
 Dehnow-e Bala, Hamadan
 Dehnow-e Bala, Hormozgan
 Deh-e Now Bala, Rafsanjan, Kerman Province
 Deh Now-e Bala, Sirjan, Kerman Province